Alice is an American sitcom television series that aired on CBS from August 31, 1976, to March 19, 1985. The series is based on the 1974 film Alice Doesn't Live Here Anymore. The show stars Linda Lavin in the title role, a widow who moves with her young son to start life over again, and finds a job working at a roadside diner in Phoenix, Arizona. Most of the episodes revolve around events at Mel's Diner, where Alice is employed.

Series summary 
Alice Spivak Hyatt (Lavin) is an unemployed widow after her husband Donald is killed in a trucking accident, and with her young son Tommy (played by Alfred Lutter in the television pilot, reprising his role from the film, but portrayed by Philip McKeon thereafter) heads from their New Jersey home to Los Angeles to pursue a singing career. Her car breaks down in Phoenix, and we meet her soon after she has taken a job as a waitress at Mel's Diner, in Phoenix. (The later seasons' exterior shots were of a real diner, named Mel's, still in operation in Phoenix.) Alice works alongside Mel Sharples (Vic Tayback), the grouchy, stingy owner and cook of the greasy spoon, and fellow waitresses and friends, sassy, man-hungry Florence Jean "Flo" Castleberry (Polly Holliday), and neurotic, scatterbrained Vera Louise Gorman (Beth Howland).

Each episode invariably started inside the diner, and most if not all subsequent scenes took place there as well. A frequent set for non-diner scenes was Alice's one-bedroom apartment in the Desert Sun apartments. (Tommy used the bedroom and Alice slept on a sleeper sofa in the living room.) Vera and Mel's studio apartments and Flo's trailer were occasionally seen. Two of the diner's biggest competitors, Barney's Burger Barn and Vinnie's House of Veal, were sometimes mentioned.

The diner had its share of regular customers through the years, such as Tommy's basketball coach Earl Hicks (Dave Madden), local trucker Chuck (played by Duane R. Campbell), and Henry Beesmeyer (Marvin Kaplan), a telephone repairman who always joked about Mel's cooking. Henry's oft-mentioned wife Chloe was seen in one episode, played by Ruth Buzzi. Celebrities playing either themselves or other characters (including Martha Raye (as Mel's free-spirited mother), George Burns, Robert Goulet, Art Carney, Desi Arnaz, and Jerry Reed) were a hallmark of the show.

Polly Holliday left the show to star in her own spin-off series, Flo. In the episode airing February 24, 1980, Flo leaves to take a hostess job in Houston. On the way to Houston, Flo stops at her hometown Fort Worth, Texas (which she refers to by its moniker "Cowtown"). Flo decides to buy and run a failing roadhouse bar there, which she renames Flo's Yellow Rose. Polly Holliday never made a guest appearance on Alice after beginning Flo, although flashbacks including Flo were shown in the final episode of Alice. Vic Tayback made one guest appearance on Flo.

Diane Ladd, who received an Academy Award nomination for her portrayal of Flo in the film version joined the cast in 1980 as Isabelle "Belle" Dupree, a hard-edged but kind-hearted woman. She had been a waitress of Mel's in the past, during which the two had a romantic relationship. Despite Ladd's Golden Globe-winning performance as Belle, the character was not retained for the duration of the series and was replaced early in 1981, the character making one last appearance in which she telephones the diner to inform everyone that she had taken a job as a backup singer in Nashville, Tennessee. It has been said that Ladd clashed with her co-stars, and no flashbacks including Belle were shown during the series' final episode.

Theatre actress Celia Weston then joined the cast as the good-natured, boisterous truck driver Jolene Hunnicutt, who came from Myrtle Point, South Carolina.  Jolene arrives as she and her male driving partner are in the midst of an argument over his unwelcome advances, during which she throws and breaks many of Mel's dishes. Mel agrees to hire her "temporarily" to work off the cost of the dishes, but she stays until the end of the series. Jolene frequently mentions her grandmother, "Granny Gums", who had only three or four teeth. Jolene also mentions her distant relative Jefferson Davis "Boss" Hogg, a character from the concurrent CBS series The Dukes of Hazzard. In one episode Sorrell Booke guest stars in this role, along with fellow Dukes character Enos (Sonny Shroyer).

The latter years of the show focused on some character development, such as the hasty courtship and marriage of Vera and lovable cop Elliot (Charles Levin). Tommy eventually goes to college and is seen less frequently. In the final season, the character of Alice was absent several times due to Lavin's directing a number of episodes and playing the character of Mrs. Walden, Vera's wizened, abrasive landlady of arbitrary foreign origin. The final story arc began in the spring of 1985, when country singer Travis Marsh (played by Lavin's real-life husband Kip Niven), discovering that he's falling for Alice, "kidnaps" her to take her to Nashville, telling her it's time to follow her dream there. Bewildered at the thought of her dreams finally coming true, Alice agrees, but not without extracting a promise from Travis to drive her back to Phoenix so she can get her affairs in order, including ending her current relationship with a writer.

In the series finale, which aired March 19, 1985, typical of sitcoms of the era, news of several life-changing events is revealed within a matter of minutes. After 9 years of trying, Alice finally gets a recording contract and is moving to Nashville with Travis Marsh. Vera announces she is pregnant and decides to be a full-time mother, Elliott having been promoted from officer to detective. Jolene's "Granny Gums" dies and leaves her enough money to open her own beauty parlor in her hometown. Besides all three waitresses suddenly leaving simultaneously, by an amazing coincidence Mel has just sold the diner for a large amount of money to a real-estate developer and must close within days. On closing day, he surprisingly gives each waitress a $5,000 farewell bonus. The remainder of the episode shows flashback to humorous and major events, and many of the big stars who had appeared on the show, including Polly Holliday. Finally, while cleaning out her locker, Alice finds the "Waitress Wanted" sign that first drew her to the diner. The series' regular customers, including Henry, Chuck, and Earl, say their emotional farewells, followed by Elliot, and finally the principal characters Tommy, Jolene, Vera, and Alice. The last thing we see is Mel putting up the "Closed" sign and locking up.

Running gags and catchphrases
Flo's catchphrase, "Kiss my grits!" (typically directed at her boss, Mel), enjoyed widespread popularity at the time the character appeared on Alice. According to Polly Holliday, the line was originally written as, "Kiss my honeydew!", but did not get any laughs. (In the original film, Flo, as played by Diane Ladd, tells Mel in one scene to "Kiss me where the sun don't shine.") Another of Flo's catchphrases was, "When donkeys fly!" Since her portrayal of Flo, Polly Holliday has refused to repeat her famous "grits" line.

In an attempt to duplicate the success of Flo's "Kiss my grits!", Belle began using a new put-down: "Butter my biscuits!" Belle often used the phrase, "My little voice", who called her "Isabelle", which she usually used when starting to tell others what she thinks is best.

Mel would snipe, "Stow it!" at anyone he had qualms with, especially his waitstaff. "Stow it!" was usually followed by either "Alice", "Vera", "Flo" "Belle", or "Blondie" (in reference to Jolene). He would also bark, "Bag it, Blondie!" to Jolene. He eventually gave Vera the nickname "Dingy" and would occasionally bellow "Stow it, Dingy" at her. Jolene would sometimes say, "When pigs wear perfume."

In a handful of episodes, Alice put on a double-breasted suit and fedora to assume the character of husky-voiced "Sam Butler", a mobster she made up as a ruse to fool her intended target. Linda Lavin also played the role of Mrs. Walden in the last season, once even playing both Alice and Mrs. Walden in a split-screen dual role.

Part of Mel's Diner was often destroyed, such as by Flo's crashing a truck through the front, Mel chopping down a tree which landed on the diner, Mel accidentally having the building targeted for demolition, and the waitresses crashing a hot air balloon through the roof (upon which Jolene cries, "We went to the bad place and it looks just like Mel's!"). In one episode, a wrecking ball destroyed the front of the diner because someone could not read Mel's handwriting. In another, a group of men literally hoisted up the entire front of the diner with their bare hands.

Mel was a stickler for punctuality. In the fourth season, he installs a time clock, which ends up working to the waitresses' advantage due to significant overtime (since before then they were forced to clean the storage room on Sundays without extra pay), and he finally smashes it onto the floor. Mel also had a strict rule against moonlighting, often leading to one or more waitresses getting fired, but he always rehired them before the end of each episode.

Although he had a fairly loyal clientele, Mel's food and cooking were constantly criticized by his waitresses and customers alike—especially Henry, who always blamed it for his indigestion. However, Mel's chili con carne was popular and became a plot point of several episodes. During the first season, a newspaper food critic (played by Victor Buono) dropped dead while eating Mel's chili, but it turned out that tainted Peking Duck from a Chinese restaurant was to blame. Art Carney guest-starred in one episode as the spokesman for retail distribution of Mel's Chili ("Chili con Carney") who backed out when he discovered Vera was a distant relative with part ownership in the venture. The popularity of Mel's Chili also led to an appearance on Dinah Shore's talk show, which led to some bickering among the waitresses because Mel could take only one person along, but everyone ended up going. Mel refused to reveal his "secret ingredient" to Dinah and her TV audience during the cooking demonstration.

Cast 
Opening title cast members:
 Linda Lavin as Alice Hyatt
 Vic Tayback as Mel Sharples (Tayback reprised his role from the film)
 Philip McKeon as Tommy Hyatt (Alfred Lutter had initially reprised his role from the film but was replaced by McKeon after the pilot episode)
 Polly Holliday as Florence Jean Castleberry (Seasons 1–4: 1976–1980)
 Beth Howland as Vera Louise Gorman Novak
 Diane Ladd as Isabelle "Belle" Dupree (Seasons 4–5: 1980–1981) (Ladd played the role of Flo in the film)
 Celia Weston as Jolene Hunnicutt (Seasons 5–9: 1981–1985)
 Charles Levin as Elliot Novak (Season 8 recurring, Season 9 regular: 1983–85)

Other recurring cast members:
 Marvin Kaplan as Henry Beesmeyer (diner regular who worked for the phone company) (1977–1985)
 Dave Madden as Earl Hicks, a basketball coach, date to Flo and a diner customer (1978–1985)
 Victoria Carroll as Marie Massey (Mel's girlfriend) (1978–1984)
 Martha Raye as Carrie Sharples (Mel's mother) (1978–1984)
 Doris Roberts as Mona Spivak (Alice's mother) (1981–1982)
 Robert Picardo as Officer Maxwell, a police officer and Elliott's partner (1982–1984)
 Pat Cranshaw as Andy (diner regular) (1976–1978)
 Tony Longo as Artie (diner regular) (1981–1984)
 Patrick J. Cronin as Jason (diner regular) (1976–1980)
 Duane R. Campbell as Chuck (diner regular) (1978–1985)
 Ted Gehring as Charlie (diner regular) (1979–1982)
 Alan Haufrect as Brian (diner regular) (1978–1980)

Notable guest stars include: Eve Arden, Desi Arnaz, Brice Beckham, Fred Berry, Sorrell Booke (as Boss Hogg), George Burns (as himself), Ruth Buzzi (as Chloe Beesmeyer, Henry's wife), Art Carney (as himself), Corey Feldman, Robert Goulet, Joel Grey (as himself), Florence Halop, Eileen Heckart (as Rose Hyatt, Alice's interfering mother in-law), Florence Henderson, Jay Leno, Bill Maher, Rue McClanahan, George Wendt, Nancy McKeon (Philip's sister, appearing twice, in different roles), Frank Nelson, Donald O'Connor (as himself), Janis Paige, Kelly Parsons, Jerry Reed (as himself), Debbie Reynolds, Kim Richards, Michael Rupert, Telly Savalas (as himself), Sonny Shroyer (as Enos Strate), Jerry Stiller, and Jim Varney.

Production information 
The show's theme was called "There's a New Girl in Town", with music by David Shire, lyrics by Alan and Marilyn Bergman; performed by Linda Lavin. Several arrangements of this tune were used throughout the series' run; the lyrics were altered after the second season.

In the opening credits Alice and Tommy pass under overhead road signs that say "Phoenix" and "El Paso". The only location this occurs in this configuration is at the northern end of Interstate 19 in Tucson.

The Mel's Diner set made changes over the years; in the pilot the diner contained a blue refrigerator, but in the series the refrigerator was a dirty stainless steel, then later was changed to clean and shiny stainless steel in 1979–81 and much later the set featured an even shinier stainless steel refrigerator and better appliances. The rest of the set, however, remained the same.

The men's and ladies' restrooms were confined to one room in the pilot and during the first season. From 1977 to 1985, there were separate restrooms with "Ladies" and "Men" written on them.

The storeroom was inside the diner where the men's restroom would later be and said "Private" on it during the 1976–77 season. The storeroom from 1977 to 1985 was confined to the back of the diner. Here, the waitresses took their breaks, had their lockers, and stored their uniforms. Mel also conducted his business from this space.

The payphone was a touch tone and was located on the left of the "Restrooms" door in the pilot episode. For the first season, it was moved to the right of the doors that led to the kitchen section of the diner. For the second season, it was moved to the wall between the two doors that became two separate restrooms and was replaced by a phone with a rotary dial. From 1978 to 1985, the phone was a touch tone and was located at a section that was a few steps away from the entrance to the diner.

In the first season, the diner was decorated in an Aztec and cowboy motif to accommodate the feel of Arizona. For the second season, the walls had pink wallpaper with red lines on it. For the third season, the walls had wallpaper with orange leaves on it.

The giant "14-ounce coffee cup" sign used in later seasons was seen by a producer scouting Phoenix for an establishing shot for the show's later seasons. It was at "Chris' Diner" and the owner agreed to change the name to Mel's for the show.

The cash register was a Sweda Model 46 and was fully functional for the first few seasons. Later in the series it no longer worked and was shown with the "0" in the cents position off-center due to the register being locked up.

Alice's apartment remained more or less unchanged during most of the show's run; the apartments of Mel and Vera and Flo's trailer were occasionally seen. (The set for Flo's trailer was also used on the spinoff Flo.)

The pilot episode was taped at CBS Television City in Hollywood, California. After this, the series was taped at The Warner Bros. Studios in Burbank, California.

Arthur Marx, son of Groucho Marx, co-wrote (with writing partner Robert Fisher and others) 39 episodes of the series, from season two through season six.

Differences between the film and television series 
Alice had many contrasts with the film on which it was based, Alice Doesn't Live Here Anymore.  The tone and style of the series differed greatly from the film, and there were a number of factual differences concerning the characters and setting.

Episodes

Syndication and international broadcasts
Alice was seen in reruns:
 from June 2, 1980, to September 17, 1982, on CBS daytime at 10:30 a.m. (EST), replacing Whew! (before it was itself replaced with Child's Play);
 via syndication on many local broadcast stations beginning in the fall of 1982.  
 in the late 1980s on superstation TBS (WTBS) from Atlanta;
 sporadically from the mid-1990s until early 1998 on E!;
 on TNN from late June 1999 to January 2001.
 The show returned to television on April 2, 2007, airing on the Ion Television network weekdays at 7:30 P.M. until June 22, 2007. The show was heavily edited to make time for additional commercials, with several minutes of important plot often haphazardly cut, in order to comply with the 22-minute limit. The show returned to ION on November 24, 2007, with two back-to-back episodes at 7:00pm EST Monday through Thursday, and continued until the entire series' episodes had been aired. It was replaced by Family Feud on April 7, 2008.
Logo TV started airing episodes in April 2017.
Antenna TV starting airing episodes in January 2018.

International

Alice was shown on the Ten Network in Australia from 1977. It was mostly aired on a sporadic basis, with broadcast schedules and timeslots varying between each city, and by the 1980s was more commonly scheduled to air during summer ratings hiatus.

Alice was shown on Canale 5 in Italy from April 1982.

Alice was shown in the UK by Channel 4, starting on 27 August 1984. At first, the series was shown each weekday at 5.00pm, before moving to a twice-weekly slot later. No breaks between seasons were made and the final episode was shown in October 1986.

Home media
On June 27, 2006, six episodes of Alice were released on DVD by Warner Bros. Home Video as part of the Warner Bros.' Television Favorites compilation series. The episodes were hand-picked by fans at SitcomsOnline.com, as follows:

 "Alice Gets a Pass", September 29, 1976 – First non-pilot episode.
 "The Odd Couple", February 26, 1977 – When Flo's trailer is stolen, Alice allows Flo to move in with her and finds Flo's habits difficult to handle.
 "Close Encounters of the Worst Kind", January 22, 1978 – Alice's use of psychology causes tension among her coworkers.
 "Block Those Kicks", October 22, 1978 – The waitresses decide to give up their bad habits in order to encourage Mel to give up his gambling habit.
 "Cabin Fever", December 2, 1979 – The waitresses, Mel and his girlfriend unknowingly book the same cabin during the same weekend.
 "Flo's Farewell", February 24, 1980 – Flo leaves Mel's Diner for a hosting job at a restaurant in Texas.

Warner Home Video has released all nine seasons on DVD in Region 1 via their Warner Archive Collection. These manufacture-on-demand (MOD) releases, available through Warner's online store Warner Archives Collection, are sold only in the US.  The complete ninth and final season was released on March 12, 2019.

Streaming availability
The entire series is available from Apple iTunes Store and Amazon Video for downloading. In addition, a holiday episode from Season 3 is available from Amazon.

Book
A book chronicling the development of the TV series, entitled Alice: Life Behind the Counter in Mel's Greasy Spoon (A Guide to the Feature Film, the TV Series, and More), was published by BearManor Media in September 2019.

Awards 
The "Tommy's Lost Weekend" episode, written by Bob Bendetson, Howard Bendetson, and Robert Getchell, based on a story by Arnold Anthony Schmidt, received an Emmy nomination in 1984.

References

External links 

 
 

1976 American television series debuts
1985 American television series endings
1970s American sitcoms
1980s American sitcoms
1970s American workplace comedy television series
1980s American workplace comedy television series
Best Musical or Comedy Series Golden Globe winners
CBS original programming
English-language television shows
Live action television shows based on films
Television series about widowhood
Television series by Warner Bros. Television Studios
Television shows set in Maricopa County, Arizona
Television shows set in Arizona
Television series set in restaurants